The Desulfurobacteriaceae family are bacteria belonging to the Aquificota phylum.

Phylogeny

Taxonomy
The currently accepted taxonomy is based on the List of Prokaryotic names with Standing in Nomenclature (LSPN) and the National Center for Biotechnology Information (NCBI).

 Class "Desulfurobacteriia"
 Order Desulfurobacteriales Gupta & Lali 2014
 Family Desulfurobacteriaceae L'Haridon et al. 2006 em. Gupta & Lali 2013
 Genus Balnearium Takai et al. 2003
 Species B. lithotrophicum Takai et al. 2003
 Genus Desulfurobacterium L'Haridon et al. 1998 emend. L'Haridon et al. 2006
 Species D. atlanticum L'Haridon et al. 2006
 Species "D. crinifex" Alain et al. 2003
 Species D. indicum Cao et al. 2017
 Species D. pacificum L'Haridon et al. 2006
 Species D. thermolithotrophum L'Haridon et al. 1998 (type sp.)
 Genus Phorcysia Pérez-Rodríguez et al. 2012
 Species P. thermohydrogeniphila Pérez-Rodríguez et al. 2012
 Genus Thermovibrio Huber et al. 2002
 Species T. ammonificans Vetriani et al. 2004
 Species T. guaymasensis L'Haridon et al. 2006
 Species T. ruber Huber et al. 2002 (type sp.)

References

 Reysenbach A-L, Phylum BI (2001) Aquificae phy. nov. In: Boone DR, Castenholz RW (eds) Bergey's Manual of Systematic Bacteriology. Springer-Verlag, Berlin, 2nd edn., pp. 359–367

Aquificota